The Skeleton Twins is a 2014 American comedy-drama film  directed by Craig Johnson and starring Bill Hader and Kristen Wiig. The film premiered in competition at 2014 Sundance Film Festival on January 18, 2014. It won the Screenwriting Award: U.S. Dramatic at the festival. Wiig and Hader play twins in the film. The film received positive reviews; critics praised Johnson's direction and the performances of Hader and Wiig.

Plot
Maggie is in her bathroom preparing to swallow a handful of pills, but she is interrupted by a phone call from a hospital, informing her that her twin brother Milo—whom she hasn't seen in 10 years—has attempted suicide. Maggie visits Milo in the hospital in Los Angeles and suggests that he come to stay with her in their childhood hometown of Nyack, New York. He agrees, and meets Maggie's husband Lance.

Milo is surprised when Lance tells him that he and Maggie are trying to have a baby, as Maggie never expressed a desire for children. Maggie later confesses to Milo that she's been taking contraceptive pills, both to avoid having a child with Lance and because she had been having sex with her scuba instructor Billy. She worries that she is not worthy of Lance, but Milo reassures her.

Milo reconnects with his high school English teacher Rich, with whom he had a sexual relationship when he was 15. Rich now has a sixteen-year-old son and is dating a woman. Milo and Rich spend the night together. Later, Milo appears at Rich's house while his son is there. This infuriates Rich, who does not want his past exposed. Maggie is also upset with Milo for resuming contact with Rich, whose teaching career had ended when Maggie exposed their relationship.

Milo tells Maggie about a boy that had once bullied him, a boy whom their father had assured him would reach his peak in high school and have a miserable adult life. But it turns out that the bully has a successful happy life, and it is Milo who had peaked in high school. Maggie asks for reassurance that he will not kill himself, and he promises to try not to.

Lance confides to Milo that he is concerned that he may be infertile. Milo mentions that Maggie used to hide cigarettes around the house, leading Lance to find the contraceptives.

Maggie ends the relationship with Billy and returns home where she is confronted by Lance, who is painfully confused by the birth control pills he has found. She admits to her affairs, then confronts Milo, blaming him for ruining her marriage. Milo retorts that it was no "marriage" and she lashes back suggesting that next time he tries suicide he should do it right. Maggie leaves Milo a voicemail echoing his suicide note and goes to the pool where she had been taking scuba lessons. Tying weights to her body, she jumps into the pool. As she begins to drown, she panics but is unable to free herself. Milo, having heard her message, jumps into the pool and rescues her.

The film closes with the twins at Maggie's house, looking at their new fish tank filled with goldfish.

Cast
 Bill Hader as Milo Dean, Maggie's brother
 Kristen Wiig as Maggie Dean, Milo's sister
 Luke Wilson as Lance, Maggie's husband
 Ty Burrell as Rich Levitt, Milo's former teacher whom he'd had an affair with in high school
 Boyd Holbrook as Billy, Maggie's scuba instructor
 Joanna Gleason as Judy Dean, Maggie and Milo's mother
 Adriane Lenox as Dr. Linda Essex
 Kathleen Rose Perkins as Carlie
 Paul Castro Jr as Eric

Production
The script went through several iterations, including one in which Milo is a drag queen and the film more closely resembles a road trip movie, but eventually Johnson and his writing partner settled on a more low-key approach inspired by the work of Hal Ashby and Alexander Payne. Said Johnson, "Something I wanted to be a part of this movie was brothers and sisters connecting with their secret language. No one can make you laugh harder, [but] no one can [tick] you off more." Writing the film, Johnson wanted to avoid writing along genre lines, as he believes that comedy and drama are both present in everyday life. He has described the theme of the movie as "dealing with dark shit with a sense of humor."

One notable scene features the two main characters lip syncing to "Nothing's Gonna Stop Us Now" by Starship. Initially, the song the writers planned to use was "Hold On" by Wilson Phillips, but as the song had already played a focal point in Bridesmaids, it was decided to choose another song. Accordingly, Johnson "spent 24 hours listening to every cheesy mid-’80s ballad you can think of and looking in the mirror and lip syncing it myself." The fact that "Nothing's Gonna Stop Us Now" is a duet opened up new possibilities: Johnson said, "the scene became a little more epic because it became about Bill’s character getting Maggie (Wiig) to sing Grace Slick’s part".

Principal photography, which began on November 2012 in Brooklyn, New York,  took place over 22 days. Although a full script was written, Johnson encouraged improvisation on the set. Johnson has stated that an entirely improvised conversation between Wiig and Wilson involving Vibram shoes was his single favorite scene in the entire film.

Release
The Skeleton Twins opened in a limited release in the United States in 15 theaters and grossed $380,691; the  average take per theater was $25,379, and it ranked #25 at the box office. The widest release for the film was 461 theaters, and it ultimately earned $5,279,678 domestically and $468,848 internationally for a total of $5,748,526, above its estimated budget of $1 million.

Reception
On Rotten Tomatoes the film has a rating of 87% based on 161 reviews, with an  average rating of 7/10. The website's critics consensus states: "Led by powerful performances from Kristen Wiig and Bill Hader, The Skeleton Twins effectively mines laughs and tears from family drama." On Metacritic, the film has a weighted average score of 74 out of 100, based on 33 critics indicating "generally favorable reviews".

Accolades

References

External links
 
 
 
 

2014 LGBT-related films
2014 films
American comedy-drama films
American LGBT-related films
Duplass Brothers Productions films
Films about twins
Films set in New York (state)
Films shot in New York City
LGBT-related comedy-drama films
Roadside Attractions films
2014 independent films
Films about depression
Films about suicide
Films about dysfunctional families
Twins in American films
American black comedy films
2010s English-language films
2010s American films